The Illinois Veteran Grant (IVG) is a program whereby the state of Illinois provides educational benefits to certain Illinoisans who have served in the Armed Forces of the United States.

Recipients of the IVG are provided with the full amount of tuition and fees to attend any approved public college or university in Illinois. In effect, Illinois veterans can pursue an academic degree for the cost of textbooks alone.

Veterans who were resident in the state of Illinois at least six months before entering military service and who have completed a full year or more of federal active duty (or have served in a designated combat zone) may be eligible for the grant. Qualified applicants may use this grant at the undergraduate or graduate level for the equivalent of four academic years of full-time enrollment.

References

Public education in Illinois
Veterans' affairs in the United States
Government of Illinois